Odette T. Ramos is the Baltimore City Councilmember for Baltimore's 14th District. Ramos founded Strategic Management Consulting, LLC to work on community building; one of her clients was Unchained Talent, a youth arts organization. She has served two terms on the Baltimore City Democratic Central Committee, and she was named Woman of the Year for Management Consulting by the National Association of Professional Women. In 2007 she was one of the Daily Record's Top 100 Women of Baltimore. She was endorsed by the former 14th District Councilperson, Mary Pat Clarke.  Ramos is the first Latino officeholder in Baltimore City history, and the first of Puerto Rican heritage.

References 

Maryland Democrats
Women in Maryland politics
American politicians of Puerto Rican descent
Hispanic and Latino American politicians
Hispanic and Latino American women in politics
Politics of Baltimore
Living people
Year of birth missing (living people)
Baltimore City Council members